Krosno Voivodeship was a unit of administrative division and local government in Poland in years 1975–1998, superseded by Subcarpathian Voivodeship (except Biecz Commune which is now a part of Lesser Poland Voivodeship). Its capital city was Krosno.

Major cities and towns (population in 1995)
 Krosno (49,400)
 Sanok (41,400)
 Jasło (38,900)

See also
 Voivodeships of Poland

1975 establishments in Poland
Former voivodeships of Poland (1975–1998)
History of Lesser Poland Voivodeship
History of Podkarpackie Voivodeship